Wang Yongpo (born 19 January 1987) is a Chinese professional footballer who currently plays for Chinese Super League club Shenzhen F.C.

Club career
Wang Yongpo started his football career in 2004 when he was promoted from Shandong Luneng's youth academy to the club's first team squad. He made his debut for the club on 4 December 2004 in a 1-1 draw against Tianjin Teda. His progression within the team continued the following season when he made several appearances throughout the 2005 season. He would rise to prominence within the club during the 2007 season when teammate Zheng Zhi left the team to join Charlton Athletic. With significantly more playing time throughout the season, he played a key attacking role within the club.  By the 2008 season he had become a vital player, playing 16 games and scoring seven goals for Shandong despite missing much of the season with a torn ligament.

On 8 February 2017, Wang transferred to fellow Chinese Super League side Tianjin Quanjian for 60 million Yuan on a three year contract. He made his debut for the club on 4 March 2017 in a 2-0 loss against Guangzhou R&F. He would establish himself as a vital member of the team and aided them to their highest ever position of third and qualification to the AFC Champions League for the first time in their history. With his contract nearing its end on 30 July 2019, Wang transferred to fellow top tier side Shanghai Shenhua. After only a brief period with Shenhua, which saw him win the 2019 Chinese FA Cup, Wang would join another top tier club in Shenzhen F.C. on 25 February 2020.

International career
Wang made his debut for the Chinese national team in a 1-0 win against Iran on 1 June 2009. He scored his first international goal on 6 June 2013 in a 2-1 loss against Uzbekistan.

Career statistics

Club statistics
.

International statistics

International goals
 
Scores and results list China's goal tally first.

Honours

Club
Shandong Luneng
Chinese Super League: 2006, 2008, 2010
Chinese FA Cup: 2004, 2006, 2014
Chinese Super League Cup: 2004
Chinese FA Super Cup: 2015

Shanghai Shenhua
Chinese FA Cup: 2019

Individual
Chinese Super League Domestic Golden Boot winner: 2012
Chinese Super League Team of the Year: 2012, 2013

References

External links
 Player stats at Football-lineups.com
 
 
 Shandong Luneng Team Profile at Asian Red Dragons website

1987 births
Living people
Chinese footballers
Footballers from Qingdao
China international footballers
Shandong Taishan F.C. players
Tianjin Tianhai F.C. players
Shanghai Shenhua F.C. players
Shenzhen F.C. players
Chinese Super League players
Association football midfielders
Footballers at the 2006 Asian Games
Asian Games competitors for China